Cowabbie is a rural community in the central part of the Riverina region of New South Wales, Australia.

The place name Cowabbie is derived from expression used by the local Aboriginals for cows when they were first seen in the area by these early inhabitants, and Cowabbie Station is one of the functioning properties in the area.

Cowabbie has a rich Presbyterian history.  The original church – dilapidated but memorialised by the small community surrounding it, was first built by the local Hannah family in 1865 and then transported to its current location by bullock-team in 1926.

Notes and references

Towns in the Riverina
Towns in New South Wales
Coolamon Shire